The P Street Bridge or Lauzun's Legion Bridge is a  concrete arch bridge that conveys P Street across Rock Creek and Rock Creek Park between the Georgetown and Dupont Circle neighborhoods of Northwest Washington, D.C. The first bridge at this site was constructed in 1855 and was replaced in 1935 by the current structure.

The bridge reopened on July 15, 2004, after a year-long, $3.5-million reconstruction project, the first since its completion in 1935.

Renaming
In June 2006, the Dupont Circle Advisory Neighborhood Commission (2B) discussed a proposal to give the bridge a ceremonial designation to commemorate the 225th anniversary of the end of the American Revolutionary War. On October 14, 2006, the P Street Bridge was ceremonially renamed Lauzun's Legion Bridge for Lauzun's Legion, a specially constructed unit that was formed on March 5, 1780, from various detachments of the French Army and Navy commanded by Armand Louis de Gontaut, Duc de Lauzun at the Siege of Yorktown. Present at the renaming ceremony were French Ambassador Jean-David Levitte, Jacques Bossiere, and representatives of the D.C. Daughters of the American Revolution and D.C. Children of the American Revolution.

See also
List of bridges documented by the Historic American Engineering Record in Washington, D.C.

References

External links

Bridges completed in 1855
Bridges completed in 1935
Bridges over Rock Creek (Potomac River tributary)
Dupont Circle
Georgetown (Washington, D.C.)
Historic American Engineering Record in Washington, D.C.
Road bridges in Washington, D.C.
Concrete bridges in the United States
Arch bridges in the United States
1855 establishments in Washington, D.C.